Gooseberry Hill is a suburb of Perth, Western Australia, located within the City of Kalamunda. It is the site of Gooseberry Hill National Park.

It is located at the highest point south of the departure of the Helena River from the Darling Scarp on to the Swan Coastal Plain.  It is often associated with the railway formation of the Kalamunda Zig Zag and the northernmost high feature of Statham's Quarry, which lie on the north west of the locality within national park land.

In 1861, Benjamin Robins purchased  of land in the area. In 1878 surveyor Henry Samuel Ranford recorded the name of the eponymous hill as "Gooseberry Hill" ; that name, derived from the presence of cape gooseberries in the area, referred to the Kalamunda area generally in the late 19th century. The townsite was officially gazetted on 8 June 1959.

Gooseberry Hill was the location of a war-time tragedy when a United States Navy C-47 Skytrain (DC-3) plane crashed in heavy fog on 19 April 1945 after taking off from Guildford Airport (later Perth Airport). All of the ten US servicemen and three US Red Cross women on board were killed.  The plane crashed between Gooseberry Hill Road and Lansdown Road,  from the end of the take-off runway, having travelled in an almost straight course to the point of impact.

The suburb contains two schools, Gooseberry Hill Primary School, a government school established in 1972, and Mary's Mount Primary School, a Catholic school established in 1921.

Transport 
Transperth bus routes serving the suburb are:

 Route 274, a local service operating only once a day (twice on school days) from the settlement to the northeast of Railway Road to Kalamunda bus station via Davies Crescent.
 Route 275 between High Wycombe railway station and Walliston via Kalamunda bus station along Kalamunda Road in the southwestern part of the suburb.
 Route 276 between High Wycombe railway station and Kalamunda bus station on Gooseberry Hill Road in the centre of the suburb.
 Route 307 between Kalamunda bus station and Midland Station on Gooseberry Hill Road. This route also travels along Ridge Hill Road in the northwest of the suburb, however, there are no stops on this section.

References

 
Suburbs of Perth, Western Australia
Suburbs in the City of Kalamunda